Strafforth and Tickhill , originally known as Strafforth, was the southernmost wapentake in the West Riding of Yorkshire, England.  The west of the district, plus a detached area in the east, constituted the Upper Division, while the central area and a detached part in the extreme east constituted the Lower Division.

Parishes in the Upper Division included Aston, Barnby Dun, Braithwell, Conisbrough, Dinnington, Ecclesfield, Firbeck, Handsworth, Harthill, Hatfield, Hooton Roberts, Laughton-en-le-Morthen, Maltby, Ravenfield, Rawmarsh, Rotherham, Sheffield, Slade Hooton, South Anston, Sprotborough, Stone, Thorpe Salvin, Thrybergh, Todwick, Treeton, Wales, Wath-upon-Dearne, Whiston, Wickersley and parts of Finningley.

The Lower Division included the parishes of Adwick-le-Street, Adwick-upon-Dearne, Arksey, Armthorpe, Bolton-upon-Dearne, Brodsworth, Darfield, Doncaster, Fishlake, High Melton, Hooton Pagnell, Kirk Sandall, Mexborough, Rossington, Thorne, Thurnscoe, Tickhill, Wadworth, Warmsworth, parts of Blyth, Nottinghamshire and the extra-parochial area of Hampole.

The original meeting place of the wapentake is unknown, but may have been the future site of Conisbrough Castle.

The Earldom of Strafford takes its name from a variant of this district name, wherein the first incumbent Thomas Wentworth, 1st Earl of Strafford originated.

See also
Hallamshire

References

Wapentakes of the West Riding of Yorkshire
Tickhill